Mongolian Heart is a folk musical band of Nepal. Mongolian Heart debuted in 1992 and it has received several awards including the Music Nepal Gold Medal in 1999, Kantipur FM Awards, Hits FM Award and Image Awards. While individual band members have performed around the world extensively, the band has travelled to Dubai, Australia, Hong Kong and other countries. The band is currently celebrating its 25th anniversary by performing all over the world.

Music albums
Soltini (1994)
Mongolian Heart (1996)
Mongolian Heart Volume 2 (1999) 
Mongolian Heart Volume 3 (2002) 
Mongolian Heart Volume 4 (2006) 
Mongolian Heart Volume 5 (2009)
Mongolian Heart Volume 6 (2012)
Mongolian Heart Volume 7 (2018)

Members
Raju Lama – Vocals/Composer/Writer
Boby Lama – Rhythm Guitar/Manager
Binaya Maharjan – Flute
Santosh Thapa – Drums
Babu Raja Maharjan – Madal (percussion)
Kiran Nagarkoti – Lead Guitar
Pawan Kapali – Bass Guitar

References

Nepalese musical groups
1992 establishments in Nepal
Musical groups from Kathmandu